Jack Lucas James Evans (born 10 August 2000) is an English professional footballer who plays as a left back or as a central midfielder for National League North club Hereford.

Career
Born in Warrington, Evans began his career with Blackburn Rovers at the age of six and turning professional in 2018, moving on loan to Lancaster City in December 2019.

He transferred to Forest Green Rovers in July 2020. He made his senior professional debut on 8 September 2020, in a EFL Trophy match. On 1 December 2020, Evans joined National League South side Hungerford Town on a one-month loan. On 8 February 2021, Evans joined National League North side Gloucester City on a one-month loan deal. On 13 January 2022, Evans joined National League North side AFC Fylde on loan for the remainder of the 2021–22 season. At the end of the 2021–22 season, Evans was one of seven players released by Forest Green.

On 29 July 2022, Evans signed for National League North club Hereford.

Career statistics

References

2000 births
Living people
Footballers from Warrington
English footballers
Association football fullbacks
Association football midfielders
Blackburn Rovers F.C. players
Lancaster City F.C. players
Forest Green Rovers F.C. players
Hungerford Town F.C. players
Gloucester City A.F.C. players
AFC Fylde players
Hereford F.C. players
Northern Premier League players
National League (English football) players
English Football League players